Nielsenichthys pullus is a species of viviparous brotula found in Pacific Ocean waters around Indonesia where it occurs at depths of .  This species grows to a length of  SL.  This is the only known species in its genus.

References
 

Bythitidae
Monotypic fish genera
Fish described in 2011